The Chiua (also: Chiua Mare) is a left tributary of the river Șușița in Romania. It discharges into the Șușița near Dragosloveni.

References

 Valea Șușiței 

Rivers of Romania
Rivers of Vrancea County